Zdzisław Żygulski (18 August 1921 – 14 May 2015) was a Polish art historian and professor of the Academy of Fine Arts in Kraków. The son of Zdzisław Żygulski (senior), he was the curator of the Arms and Armour Section of the Czartoryski Museum from 1949 until his death in 2015 in Kraków, aged 93.

From 1975–81, he was the President of the International Association of Museums of Art and Military History. He lectured at the Academy of Fine Arts in Kraków and at universities in the United States (in New York City and Storrs, Connecticut).

Notable books

 Broń w dawnej Polsce...
 Muzeum Czartoryskich. Historia i zbiory
 Skarby znad Morza Czarnego
 Sztuka perska
 Sztuka turecka

References

1921 births
2015 deaths
Jagiellonian University alumni
Polish art historians